The African Journal of Legal Studies is a peer-reviewed academic journal covering human rights and law issues in Africa. The founding editor-in-chief is Professor Charles Chernor Jalloh (Florida International University College of Law). The journal is abstracted and indexed in ProQuest databases. The journal was established in 2005 under the auspices of the Africa Law Institut. Since 2011 (volume 4), it is published by  Martinus Nijhoff Publishers.

External links 
 

Law journals
Publications established in 2004
English-language journals
Brill Publishers academic journals
Triannual journals